Chris Pilgrim (born 13 January 1986 in Birkenhead) is a retired English rugby union player, his position is scrum-half. He played for Newcastle Falcons in the Guinness Premiership. He made his debut in 2009 at Welford Road against Leicester Tigers and went on to play another five seasons and 88 games for the club He finished his career with Yorkshire Carnegie.
He attended St Anselms College Birkenhead and Loughborough University where he was rewarded with a sports scolorship and full loughborough colours. Whilst at Loughborough he gained representative honours for England Students and England Counties.

References

External links
Newcastle Falcons player profile

1986 births
Living people
English rugby union players
Rugby union scrum-halves
Alumni of Loughborough University
Newcastle Falcons players
People educated at St. Anselm's College
Rugby union players from Birkenhead